Marcus Thomas is a Belgian-born American actor. He studied international relations and art at Occidental College.

Filmography

References

External links
Official website Marcusthomas.net

Living people
American male film actors
1973 births